Quercus sartorii is a species of oak tree known by the common name of Sartors oak. It is native to central and southern Mexico from Veracruz, San Luis Potosi, Hidalgo, Puebla, Oaxaca to Tamaulipas.

References

sartorii